Busch is an unincorporated community in Carroll County, Arkansas, United States.

References

Unincorporated communities in Carroll County, Arkansas
Unincorporated communities in Arkansas